Mary Help of Christians Academy is an all-girls, Roman Catholic high school in North Haledon, in Passaic County, New Jersey, United States, serving students in eighth through twelfth grades. Operated by the Salesian Sisters of St. John Bosco, the school is located in the Roman Catholic Diocese of Paterson, though the school is operated independently of the Diocese. Founded as an orphanage in 1921, the school took its current identity as a Catholic high school in 1944, and has been accredited by the Middle States Association of Colleges and Schools Commission on Elementary and Secondary Schools since 1978.

As of the 2019–20 school year, the school had an enrollment of 159 students and 31.8 classroom teachers (on an FTE basis), for a student–teacher ratio of 5:1. The school's student body was 60.4% (96) White, 28.3% (45) Hispanic, 5.7% (9) Black, 3.8% (6) two or more races and 1.9% (3) Asian.

History
Mary Help of Christians Academy, a Catholic preparatory school in the Salesian tradition, embraces the charism of reason, religion and loving kindness as inspired by St. John Bosco and St. Mary Mazzarello. The school was founded as an orphanage and later became a boarding school for young women. It is situated on a  tract of land that was known as the Muhs Estate on Belmont Avenue in North Haledon. In 1921, the Muhs Estate was sold by its owner to the Salesian Sisters of St. John Bosco of the Eastern Province, and in 1924, Mary Help of Christians Academy opened its doors. The academy was established with 76 boarding students and 5 day students, most of whom were orphans. At present, Mary Help of Christians Academy is a comprehensive college preparatory day school, which offers Advanced Placement courses, dual enrollment college credit bearing courses, and specialized internships in a variety of career fields.

The academy hosts summer programs for younger children in which students at the academy volunteer their time as camp counselors.

Athletics
The Mary Help of Christians Blue Jays participate in the North Jersey Interscholastic Conference, which is comprised of small-enrollment schools in Bergen, Hudson, Morris and Passaic counties, and was created following a reorganization of sports leagues in Northern New Jersey by the New Jersey State Interscholastic Athletic Association (NJSIAA). Prior to the realignment that took effect in the fall of 2010, MHCA spent one year as a member of the smaller Bergen County Scholastic League (BCSL). With 198 students in grades 10–12, the school was classified by the NJSIAA for the 2019–20 school year as Non-Public B for most athletic competition purposes, which included schools with an enrollment of 37 to 366 students in that grade range (equivalent to Group I for public schools).

Sports offered at Mary Help include basketball, bowling, cheerleading, dance team, soccer, softball, tennis and volleyball.

References

External links
 School Website
 Athletic Website

1924 establishments in New Jersey
Educational institutions established in 1924
Girls' schools in New Jersey
Middle States Commission on Secondary Schools
Private high schools in Passaic County, New Jersey
Roman Catholic Diocese of Paterson
Catholic secondary schools in New Jersey